Krylvika Bight is a southern lobe of the Fimbul Ice Shelf, indenting the coast of Queen Maud Land, Antarctica, for about  between Båkeneset Headland and Trollkjelneset Headland. It was mapped by Norwegian cartographers from surveys and air photos by the Norwegian–British–Swedish Antarctic Expedition (1949–52) and air photos by the Norwegian expedition (1958–59) and named Krylvika (the hump bay), probably in association with nearby Krylen Hill.

References

Bays of Queen Maud Land
Princess Martha Coast
Bights (geography)